Ruaidhrí Ó Dubhda was King of Ui Fiachrach Muaidhe.

Ruaidhrí succeeded his father, Donell, in 1380.

The contemporary Annals of Ulster state, sub anno 1417, Ruaidhri, son of Domnaill Ua Dubhda, namely, king of Ui-Fiachrach, died in his own stronghold after victory of penance.

External links
 http://www.ucc.ie/celt/published/T100005C/index.html

Monarchs from County Mayo
People from County Sligo
14th-century Irish monarchs
15th-century Irish monarchs
1417 deaths
Year of birth unknown